Paris Calling is a 1941 war film noir directed by Edwin L. Marin and starring Randolph Scott, Elisabeth Bergner, and Basil Rathbone.

Plot

Cast
 Elisabeth Bergner as Marianne Jannetier
 Randolph Scott as Lt. Nicholas 'Nick' Jordan
 Basil Rathbone as Andre Benoit
 Gale Sondergaard as Colette
 Lee J. Cobb as Captain Schwabe
 Charles Arnt as Lt. Lantz
 Edward Ciannelli as Mouche
 Elisabeth Risdon as Madame Jannetier
 Georges Renavent as Butler
 William Edmunds as Prof. Marceau
 J. Pat O'Malley as Sgt. Bruce McAvoy
 George Metaxa as Waiter
 Paul Leyssac as Chief of underground
 Gene Garrick as Wolfgang Schmitt
 Paul Bryar as Paul 
 Otto Reichow as Gruber
 Adolph Milar as Gestapo agent
 Marion Murray as Charie
 Grace Lenard as Marie
 Yvette Bentley as Simone
 Marcia Ralston as Renne

Production notes
 Production dates: July 22 to Mid-September 1941
 This was the first film made in America by noted European stage and screen actress Elisabeth Bergner, whose name is spelled "Elizabeth" in the onscreen credits.

External links

 

1941 films
1940s English-language films
Films about the French Resistance
American spy films
1940s war films
World War II films made in wartime
Films set in Paris
Films set in France
Films directed by Edwin L. Marin
American black-and-white films
Films with screenplays by Hans Székely
American war films